The following is a list of head coaches of Leeds Rhinos Rugby League Football Club and their major honours from the beginning of the club's official managerial records in 1936 to the present day. Each manager's entry includes the dates of his tenure and honours won while under his care. As of 2022 Leeds Rhinos have had 23 full-time coaches as well as 3 intern coaches.

Statistics
The statistics include all competitive first team fixtures.
Information correct as of 20 April 2022.

Key
 = Intern head coachP = Matches played; W = Matches won; D = Matches drawn; L = Matches lost;

Coaches with honours

References
 

Leeds Rhinos